is a Japanese football player currently playing for Iwate Grulla Morioka.

Career statistics
Updated to 19 February 2019.

References

External links
Profile at Jubilo Iwata

1986 births
Living people
Association football people from Mie Prefecture
Japanese footballers
J1 League players
J2 League players
J3 League players
Júbilo Iwata players
Kyoto Sanga FC players
Kawasaki Frontale players
Yokohama FC players
Iwate Grulla Morioka players
Association football defenders